Tirgua National Park, also known as General Manuel Manrique National Park, is a national park in Venezuela. It protects the headwaters of several waterways, especially the river Tirgua, which gives its name to the park.

It is located between the municipalities San Carlos and Anzoátegui of the state Cojedes and the municipality Nirgua of the state Yaracuy, occupying an approximate area of 910 km2.

It consists of deciduous and semi-deciduous forests, with many palm trees in the understory.

Mammals include araguato capuchin monkeys, cunaguaros, lapas, and tapirs.

See also
List of national parks of Venezuela
Morrocoy National Park

References

National parks of Venezuela
Protected areas established in 1992